Our Winning Season is a 1978 American drama film directed by Joseph Ruben from a screenplay by Nicholas Niciphor.

Plot
During the 1960s, David Wakefield is a distance runner for his high school's track and field team who hopes to compete in college.

His sister Cathy's boyfriend, Dean Berger, is a former track star who tries to advise David, telling him to be more patient during races and hold back, rather than exhausting himself by going too fast too soon. David is influenced by others in school, like friend Paul Morelli, and reassesses his life after Dean goes off to the Vietnam War and is killed.

Cast
Scott Jacoby as David Wakefield
Deborah Benson as Alice Baker
Dennis Quaid as Paul Morelli
Robert Wahler as Burton Fleishauer
Randy Hermann as Jerry McDuffy
Joe Penny as Dean Berger
Jan Smithers as Cathy Wakefield
P.J. Soles as Cindy Hawkins
Wendy Rastattar as Susie Wilson
Damon Douglas as Miller
Joanna Cassidy as Sheila
J. Don Ferguson as Coach Michael Murphy
Jeff Soracco as Eddie Rice
Ted Henning as Mr. Wetzle

External links 
 
 

1978 films
American track and field films
American coming-of-age drama films
American International Pictures films
Films scored by Charles Fox
Films set in the 1960s
Films shot in Georgia (U.S. state)
Films directed by Joseph Ruben
1978 drama films
1970s coming-of-age drama films
Films produced by Joe Roth
1970s English-language films
1970s American films